Vodny Stadion (Water Stadium) is a Moscow Metro station on the Zamoskvoretskaya Line. It was built in 1964 according to the standard pillar-trispan design. The pillars are clad in bluish marble and the walls are tiled in white with two stripes of blue at the base. The two entrances to the station are located near the intersection of Kronshtadtsky Boulevard and the Golovinskoye highway. The architects for this station were N. Demchinsky, Yu. Kolesnikova, and M. Markovsky.

The stadium is currently mostly abandoned.

Name
The station is named for the Dinamo Water Stadium at the nearby Khimki Reservoir (Moskva River).

Gallery

Moscow Metro stations
Railway stations in Russia opened in 1964
Zamoskvoretskaya Line
Railway stations located underground in Russia